Elwood Smith was an actor in theatrical productions and films. He acted in several theatrical productions and performed the roles of Ragsdale and Compere in the New York productions of St. Louis Woman and Four Saints in Three Acts, respectively.

Smith was educated at Juilliard and sang with the Xavier University Opera Guild. He was a featured performer on a New Orleans radio show sponsored by American Brewing Company's Regal beer.

Theater
Home of the Hunter (1945)
St. Louis Woman (1946)
City of Kings (play)
Pot Luck (1953)
The Love of Don Perlimplín for Belisa in Their Garden, an adaptation of Federico García Lorca's play The Love of Don Perlimplín and Belisa in the Garden.
A Raisin in the Sun (National Tour, 1960)

Filmography

Film 
Boy! What a Girl! (1947)
The Fight Never Ends (1948)

Television 

 The Bitter Cup (1951, TV movie)

References

Male actors from New Orleans
Juilliard School people

Year of birth missing (living people)
Living people